Carter, Gillespie Inc. (re-released on CD as Benny Carter, Dizzy Gillespie Inc.) is an album by saxophonist Benny Carter and trumpeter Dizzy Gillespie recorded in 1976 and released on the Pablo label.

Reception
The Allmusic review stated "Although they were from different musical generations (Benny Carter was born ten years before Dizzy Gillespie), it is little wonder that the swing altoist and the bop trumpeter could match up so well on this sextet session; they were quite compatible". The Penguin Guide to Jazz wrote of "much polite deference, some cheerful banter but not a great deal of classic music".

Track listing
 "Sweet and Lovely" (Gus Arnheim, Harry Tobias, Jules LeMare) - 10:41 
 "Broadway" (Billy Bird, Teddy McRae, Henri Woode) - 7:48 
 "The Courtship" (Benny Carter) - 6:29 
 "Constantinople" (Dizzy Gillespie) - 8:57 
 "Nobody Knows the Trouble I've Seen" (Traditional) - 9:08 
 "A Night in Tunisia" (Gillespie, Felix Paparelli) - 8:26

Personnel
Dizzy Gillespie - trumpet
Benny Carter - alto saxophone
Tommy Flanagan - piano
Joe Pass - guitar
Al McKibbon - bass
Mickey Roker - drums

References 

Pablo Records albums
Dizzy Gillespie albums
Benny Carter albums
Albums produced by Norman Granz
1976 albums